The Australasian Society of Engineers (ASE) was an Australian trade union active from 1890 to 1991. It was eventually incorporated into the Australian Workers' Union (AWU).

History
In 1890, the Australasian Society of Engineers was established as a breakaway from the Amalgamated Society of Engineers (later known as the Amalgamated Engineering Union). The Amalgamated Society had been formed by members of the British union of the same name, and the split occurred due to accusations of interference from Britain. The two organisations operated in parallel for over 80 years, and were constantly competing for members.

The ASE was first federally registered in 1910. In February 1938, it was deregistered by Judge Beeby of the Commonwealth Court of Conciliation and Arbitration, who determined that it had organised an illegal strike at a dockyard in New South Wales. The union was re-registered in August 1938, at which point it had around 6,000 members. The ASE amalgamated with the Federated Ironworkers' Association of Australia in 1991, forming the Federation of Industrial Manufacturing and Engineering Employees (FIMEE). FIMEE was merged into the Australian Workers' Union (AWU) the following year.

Notable officials
 Frank Connors, ASE official in New South Wales, later elected to state parliament
 Edgar Dawes, ASE official in South Australia, later elected to state parliament
 Valma Ferguson, ASE official in Western Australia, later elected to state parliament
 Pat Galvin, ASE official in South Australia, later elected to the House of Representatives
 Ern Klauer, ASE official in South Australia, later elected to state parliament
 John Harris, ASE official in Western Australia, later elected to the Senate
 Frederick Marshall, ASE official in Western Australia, later elected to state parliament
 Frank Mossfield, ASE official in New South Wales, later elected to the House of Representatives

References

1890 establishments in Australia
1991 disestablishments in Australia
Defunct trade unions of Australia
Trade unions established in 1890
Trade unions disestablished in 1991
Engineering trade unions